The Metacapnodiaceae are a monotypic family of fungi in the Ascomycota, class Dothideomycetes. The family contains the single genus Metacapnodium.

References

Capnodiales
Monogeneric fungus families
Dothideomycetes families